Alvignano is a comune (municipality) in the Province of Caserta in the Italian region Campania, located about  north of Naples and about  north of Caserta, at the foot of the Monti Trebulani.

Its main attractions are the Basilica of Santa Maria di Cubulteria, a rare example of Lombard architecture (8th and 9th centuries) and the Aragonese Castle.

Nearby is the ancient town of Compulteria.

References

Cities and towns in Campania
Castles in Italy